The Americas Zone was one of the three regional zones of the 1970 Davis Cup.

11 teams entered the Americas Zone: 4 teams competed in the North & Central America Zone, while 7 teams competed in the South America Zone. The winner of each sub-zone would play against each other to determine who moved to the Inter-Zonal Zone to compete against the winners of the Eastern Zone and Europe Zone.

Canada defeated New Zealand in the North & Central America Zone final, and Brazil defeated Colombia in the South America Zone final. In the Americas Inter-Zonal Final, Brazil defeated Canada and progressed to the Inter-Zonal Zone.

North & Central America Zone

Draw

Semifinals
Mexico vs. New Zealand

Canada vs. Caribbean/West Indies

Final
Canada vs. New Zealand

South America Zone

Draw

Quarterfinals
Colombia vs. Ecuador

Argentina vs. Chile

Venezuela vs. Brazil

Semifinals
Colombia vs. Uruguay

Brazil vs. Chile

Final
Brazil vs. Colombia

Americas Inter-Zonal Final
Brazil vs. Canada

References

External links
Davis Cup official website

Davis Cup Americas Zone
America Zone
Davis Cup
Davis Cup
Davis Cup
Davis Cup
Davis Cup